Batman: Curse of the White Knight is an American comic book published by DC Comics under its Black Label imprint. The eight-issue limited series, written and illustrated by Sean Murphy, began publication on July 24, 2019 and concluded on March 25, 2020. It is the sequel to Batman: White Knight and is the second installment in the Murphyverse's White Knight series, which takes place within a self-contained alternate reality that is different from and unrelated to the main DC Universe.

Batman: Curse of the White Knight occurs following the events of Batman: White Knight, with the Joker enlisting Azrael, a knight of the Order of St. Dumas, to aid him in his latest scheme against Bruce Wayne / Batman, which involves exposing a shocking secret regarding the Wayne family's legacy and its influence throughout Gotham City's history since its founding. As the mystery of his ancestry unravels, Batman must protect Gotham and his loved ones from both the Joker and Azrael in one last brutal showdown that might decide the city's future and prosperity once and for all.

Batman: Curse of the White Knight received a generally positive response from critics and audiences alike, with praise for the comic's storyline, character development, and art style. A prequel one-shot, Batman: White Knight Presents Von Freeze, was released on November 20, 2019. A spin-off series, Batman: White Knight Presents: Harley Quinn, ran from October 20, 2020 to March 23, 2021. A sequel, Batman: Beyond the White Knight, began publishing on March 29, 2022 and will end in December of the same year.

Plot

Production

Development 
In late September 2018, comic book creator Sean Murphy announced the limited series of comics titled Batman: Curse of the White Knight, as a sequel to Batman: White Knight that ran from October 2017 to May 2018, with both books as part of the Murphyverse's White Knight series. During an interview with Graeme McMillan of The Hollywood Reporter, Murphy admitted that he first came up with the idea of creating a sequel to Batman: White Knight when he was writing the script for the eighth and final issue of the series. Although he didn't think he would have another opportunity to write and draw yet another Batman comic book, a continuation was something he didn't originally plan, but correctly believed that DC Comics would give him permission to do so at the time.

Writing 
For Batman: Curse of the White Knight, Murphy wanted to focus on Gotham City's past and how it came about, claiming that because the White Knight series is set in an alternate continuity unrelated to the main DC Universe, the Gotham presented in the books deserved a different origin in comparison to that of its original counterpart usually featured in the mainstream comics. Another plot point for the series was how the Wayne family has negatively affected the city throughout history, which he felt would have a detrimental impact on Batman (Bruce Wayne), their latest descendant. In early April 2019, Murphy, on coming up with a compelling story for Batman: Curse of the White Knight, explained to Joshua Yehl of IGN: "I wanted to do a historical story about the Waynes in Gotham. And talk about how deeply both Batman and Joker are tied to the city. Gotham seems to be perpetually cursed by crime–this story talks about that curse, and how it's linked to the founding of Gotham Village in 1665".

The main antagonist of Batman: Curse of the White Knight is the Jean-Paul Valley incarnation of Azrael, a character who is typically portrayed in the comics as an antihero and ally of Batman. In an interview with Paul Shirey of JoBlo.com, when asked what inspired his choice to introduce Azrael to the series, Murphy stated: "For Curse of the While Knight, I wanted a villain that was ancient–someone who would not only upend Batman, but the entire Wayne legacy going back to the founding of Gotham. Azrael (and the Order of St. Dumas) checked all those boxes. I really wanted to get back to basics with Jean-Paul Valley, revive a lot of what made him so cool in the 90s (the fire, the sword, the over-the-top-Bible-stuff)". As inspiration for his version of Azrael, Murphy based him on John Rambo, giving Azrael a much older age and turning him into a special forces veteran suffering from post-traumatic stress disorder (PTSD), with Murphy feeling this would make Azrael a more compelling and empathetic adversary for Batman than most of his enemies.

Design 
Over the course of the series, Azrael wears two different outfits: the first being red and gold, designed to resemble the character's original costume in the comics, while the second outfit is an armored Batsuit that is nearly identical to the one worn by Azrael in the classic Batman: Knightfall story arc. In Batman: Curse of the White Knight, there is a set of Batmobiles that are used throughout the comic book, each with a design based on a previous incarnation of the vehicle from different media, such as the one seen in the 1960s Batman TV series, the one from Tim Burton's Batman and Batman Returns films, the Tumbler from Christopher Nolan's The Dark Knight Trilogy and others as well.

Conclusion 
In the aforementioned interview with The Hollywood Reporter, Murphy spoke briefly about how he sees the White Knight series as a "constant '3rd act' story", believing that each volume appears to be the last in the series when in reality it is not. More than a week before the release of the eighth and final chapter of Batman: Curse of the White Knight, Murphy teased: "In the last issue, Bruce makes a decision that will change the rest of his life and change the course of Gotham forever. The final (battle) between Batman and Azrael is literally a sword wielding duel that might leave one of them dead". Ultimately, when questioned if he intended to write more comic books for the White Knight series, Murphy said he has at least two installments planned after Batman: Curse of the White Knight.

Publication 
Batman: Curse of the White Knight was written and illustrated by Sean Murphy and colored by Matt Hollingsworth. It is the second installment in the Murphyverse's White Knight series, being preceded by Batman: White Knight. Batman: Curse of the White Knight was officially announced in September 2018 by Murphy, as a title under the DC Comics' Black Label — an imprint designed to allow writers to submit their own unique interpretations of traditional DC Universe (DCU) characters for a more mature audience. The eight issues of Batman: Curse of the White Knight were released by DC at monthly intervals, with the first being published on July 24, 2019 and the last on March 25, 2020. A collected edition containing all eight issues of the comic book was released on September 15, 2020. Four days later, a special edition of the series was launched in honor of Batman Day.

Issues

Reception

Critical response 

Reviewing Batman: Curse of the White Knight, Matthew Aguilar of ComicBook.com praised Murphy's art style, while also commending the dialogue between the characters and the series' portrayal of Batman as well. At the end of his analysis, Aguilar wrote: "Batman: Curse of the White Knight is a gorgeous and reflective look at the Dark Knight unlike any other, and we couldn't recommend it more". Kofi Outlaw of ComicBook.com compared Batman: Curse of the White Knight to Tim Burton's 1989 film, mainly due to the Batmobile featured in it, which is an exact recreation of the one seen in the film. Other similarities and references to Burton's work observed by Outlaw are the Joker's civilian persona of Jack Napier (actually the character's real name in the film) and the series' action sequences, something that Outlaw thought "could've been lifted right out of Burton's films".

Dorian Reyes Black of Screen Rant highlighted that, due to its "grounded and gritty" take, the series tackles heavy subjects such as systemic inequality and distrust of law enforcement, which, according to Black, "is nothing to laugh at", but also commented that the lighthearted references to the happiest moments in Batman's comic book history is what makes the plot fun. Dom Mah of Screen Rant opined that Batman: Curse of the White Knight is "an era-defining reframe of an iconic character" as to how it reflects and addresses several central aspects of Batman's mythology as it pertains to ongoing debates in the United States.

Jesse Schedeen of IGN described the second volume as "a worthy followup to the original", with him regarding Murphy's illustrations as "the driving force of the White Knight universe", in addition to complimenting Batman's characterization as a more sympathetic figure, calling it an improvement over the first book and noting that "there's a humanity to the character that was mostly lacking the first time around". Lissete Gonzalez of DC Comics.com expressed her opinion on how unique and exciting the trajectory Batman: Curse of the White Knight was taking was, with her conceding that what she most admired about the storytelling was the way past events still have major effects and consequences in the current events of the comic book. Olly MacNamee of Comicon.com also likened the comic book to The Dark Knight Returns, seeing Batman: Curse of the White Knight as a fresh, modern take on the miniseries.

Merchandise 
In May 2020, McFarlane Toys began a June-July pre-order of an Azrael-based action figure from Batman: Curse of the White Knight, with accessories including a sword with removable flames and figure stand, plus a collectible art card with Azrael's image on the front and his biography on the back. In September 2021, McFarlane Toys advertised the pre-order of an action figure pack based on Batman: Curse of the White Knight, launched in November priced at $39.99 (no additional charges). As part of the DC Multiverse toy line, the pack included two Batman and Azrael figures, both at 7-inch scale and with up to 22 points of articulation, plus two art cards, swords, a Batarang and flame effects.

Future

Prequel 
A special one-shot issue written by Murphy and illustrated by Klaus Janson, Batman: White Knight Presents Von Freeze, was released on November 20, 2019. As the third installment in the Murphyverse's White Knight series, it acts as a prequel to Batman: Curse of the White Knight, and follows Mr. Freeze as he reveals the difficult childhood he faced during World War II in Nazi Germany to Thomas Wayne, while the latter's wife Martha must give birth to their son Bruce.

Spin-off series 
A six-issue spin-off series focusing on Harley Quinn, Batman: White Knight Presents: Harley Quinn, co-written by Murphy and his wife Katana Collins and illustrated by Matteo Scalera, ran from October 20, 2020 to March 23, 2021. It is the fourth installment in the White Knight series, taking place two years after the events of Batman: Curse of the White Knight, and centers on Quinn as she investigates a string of murders in Gotham City while trying to adjust to her new life as a single mother of twins. The collected edition of Batman: White Knight Presents: Harley Quinn was published on June 29, 2021, also featuring the sixth chapter of the Harley Quinn Black + White + Red digital comic.

Sequel 

A fifth installment in the White Knight series and sequel to Batman: Curse of the White Knight is scheduled to begin publication on March 29, 2022 and end in December of the same year, with Murphy once again serving as writer and illustrator for the new comic book. It is titled Batman: Beyond the White Knight, and occurs twelve years succeeding the story of the previous volume, with the plot revolving around young Terry McGinnis, who becomes Bruce Wayne's successor as Batman by stealing a technologically advanced Batsuit to avenge his father's murder involving corrupt CEO Derek Powers, all while a middle-aged Bruce escapes from prison to stop Terry and retrieve the Batsuit.

See also 
 Punk Rock Jesus, another comic book series written and illustrated by Murphy.

References

External links 
  at DC Comics.com
  at IGN

2019 in comics
Action comics
American comics
Batman storylines
Batman titles
Child abduction in fiction
Comics about revenge
Comic book limited series
Comics by Sean Murphy
Comics publications
Crime comics
DC Comics limited series
DC Comics titles
Fiction set in 1685
Historical comics
Mass murder in fiction
Murphyverse
Mystery comics
Neo-noir comics
Sequel comics
Superhero comics
Works based on Batman: The Animated Series
Works based on the DC Animated Universe